The Vale of Mowbray (sometimes mistakenly referred to as the Vale of York) is a stretch of low-lying land between the North York Moors and the Hambleton Hills to the east and the Yorkshire Dales to the west. To the north lie the Cleveland lowlands and to the south the Vale of Mowbray becomes the Vale of York proper.

The Vale of Mowbray is distinguishable from the Vale of York by its meandering rivers and more undulating landscape.

The main characteristic of the Vale of Mowbray is the fertile agricultural land used for crops and permanent grassland, though isolated pockets of woodland remain. The roads in the Vale of Mowbray are characteristically contained by low hedges with wide verges. The villages are often linear following the major through road, the houses are generally brick built with pantile roofs.

Description
The vale takes its name from the family who were granted the rights to the land after the Norman Conquest of 1066. Robert de Mowbray, whose family had a stronghold at Thirsk Castle, was given the land by William the Conqueror in 1086.

The Natural England definition of the boundaries of the Vale of Mowbray are the edge of the North York Moors in the east up to the A19/A172 junction; directly across to the junction at Scotch Corner on the A1(M), then straight down the A1(M) for a western boundary and the rough line from the A168 at Dishforth to Thirsk in the east.
 Geological surveys list the Vale of Mowbray being bounded to the west by the River Ure, and in the east by the foot of the Hambleton Hills.

Features

Settlements

Bedale
Brompton
Catterick
Crakehall
East Cowton
Kirkby Fleetham
Kirkby Wiske
Middleton Quernhow
Northallerton
Romanby
Scorton
Theakston
Thirsk

Major roads
A1(M) motorway North-South
A19 North-South
A167 North-South
A684 East-West

Railways
East Coast Main Line
Northallerton–Eaglescliffe line
Scruton–Redmire
Eryholme–Richmond branch line (closed)
Leeds–Northallerton railway (closed)

Rivers

 River Swale
 River Wiske 
 Cod Beck

References

Sources

External links
 Vale of Mowbray pdf

Valleys of North Yorkshire
Natural regions of England